Dharma Productions Pvt. Ltd., commonly known and doing business as Dharma Productions, is an Indian film production and distribution company established by Yash Johar in 1979. It was taken over in 2004, after his death, by his son, Karan Johar. Based in Mumbai, it mainly produces and distributes Hindi films. 

In July 2016, a new sector of the company was launched called Dharma 2.0, which focuses on producing advertising commercials. Another subsidiary of the studio was created in November 2018, called Dharmatic Entertainment, which produces film and television content for online distribution platforms.

History

1980–1998
The company's first production was Raj Khosla's Dostana (1980) starring Amitabh Bachchan, Shatrughan Sinha, and Zeenat Aman. The film was the highest-grossing Bollywood film of the year.

The company then went on to produce Duniya (1984) and Muqaddar Ka Faisla (1987), neither of which performed well at the box office. This was followed by Agneepath (1990), which was not a box office success at that time, but would later become a cult film. It also won a National Film Award for its lead actor Amitabh Bachchan. The company's next two films Gumrah (1993) and Duplicate (1998), which were both directed by Mahesh Bhatt, met with moderate success at the box office.

All the 4 films m mentioned above, namely Duniya, Muqaddar Ka Faisla, Agneepath and Gumrah, were based on the same broad theme, which may be termed The Count of Monte Christo theme, where the protagonist is falsely accused and imprisoned for a crime which they did not commit and emerges from jail to exact vengeance from those who had framed them.

1998-2009
In 1998, the same year as Duplicate, Dharma Productions also released Kuch Kuch Hota Hai, which was the directorial debut of Karan Johar, the son of Yash Johar, owner of the production company. The film, starring Shah Rukh Khan, Kajol, Rani Mukerji and Salman Khan, proved to be a phenomenal success and this opened a whole new chapter in the history of the company. The film won several awards, including the National Film Award for Best Popular Film Providing Wholesome Entertainment and the Filmfare Award for Best Film.

The company's next film was Karan Johar's ensemble family drama Kabhi Khushi Kabhie Gham... (2001) featuring a large ensemble cast including Amitabh Bachchan, Jaya Bachchan, Shah Rukh Khan, Kajol, Hrithik Roshan, and Kareena Kapoor. This was followed by Nikhil Advani's romantic comedy-drama Kal Ho Naa Ho (2003) starring Jaya Bachchan, Shah Rukh Khan, Saif Ali Khan and Preity Zinta. Both of these films earned major critical acclaim and commercial success, and were the top domestic and overseas earners in their respective release years.

Dharma's next release was the natural horror film Kaal (2005), which received mixed reviews from critics.

This was followed by Karan Johar's romantic drama Kabhi Alvida Naa Kehna (2006) featuring a ensemble cast led by Amitabh Bachchan, Shah Rukh Khan, Abhishek Bachchan, Rani Mukerji, Preity Zinta and Kirron Kher. The film dealt with the controversial subject of marital infidelity and dysfunctional relationships. The film received highly positive reviews from critics and was a major commercial success in the domestic and overseas markets, becoming the fourth highest-grossing film of 2006 in India and the highest-grossing Indian film of all time in overseas markets at the time of its release.

Dharma's next release was Tarun Mansukhani's commercially successful romantic comedy Dostana (2008) starring Abhishek Bachchan, John Abraham, and Priyanka Chopra. This was followed by Ayan Mukerji's coming-of-age film Wake Up Sid (2009) starring Konkona Sen Sharma and Ranbir Kapoor, and Rensil D'Silva's counter-terrorism thriller Kurbaan (2009) starring Saif Ali Khan and Kareena Kapoor.

2010–present
In 2010, Dharma produced Johar's highly acclaimed social drama My Name Is Khan, as well as the romantic comedy I Hate Luv Storys (2010) starring Sonam Kapoor and Imran Khan. Later that year, the company produced the family drama We Are Family (2010), a Hindi remake of the 1998 American film Stepmom, starring Kajol, Kareena Kapoor and Arjun Rampal.

The company's first film of 2012 was Karan Malhotra's action drama Agneepath, a retelling of the eponymous 1990 film. It featured Hrithik Roshan and Sanjay Dutt in the roles originated by Amitabh Bachchan and Danny Denzongpa respectively, while Priyanka Chopra and Rishi Kapoor played two new characters. This was followed by Shakun Batra’s offbeat romantic comedy-drama Ek Main Aur Ekk Tu (2012) starring Kareena Kapoor and Imran Khan. After this came Karan Johar's coming-of-age romance Student of the Year (2012), which marked the debut of its three lead actors Sidharth Malhotra, Alia Bhatt and Varun Dhawan.

Dharma's first release of 2013 was the teen comedy Gippi. This was followed by Ayan Mukerji's coming-of-age romantic comedy-drama Yeh Jawaani Hai Deewani (2013) starring Deepika Padukone, Ranbir Kapoor, Kalki Koechlin and Aditya Roy Kapur. The film became one of the highest-grossing Bollywood films of all-time. Dharma was also one of the many production houses associated with the drama The Lunchbox (2013) starring Irrfan Khan, Nimrat Kaur, and Nawazuddin Siddiqui. They then released Punit Malhotra's romantic comedy Gori Tere Pyaar Mein (2013) starring Kareena Kapoor Khan and Imran Khan.

In 2014, Dharma produced three romantic comedies, all directed by first-time directors. The first was Vinil Mathew's Hasee Toh Phasee (2014) starring Parineeti Chopra and Sidharth Malhotra, which Dharma co-produced with Phantom Films. They then teamed with Nadiadwala Grandson Entertainment to produce Abhishek Varman's 2 States (2014) starring Arjun Kapoor and Alia Bhatt, a film adaptation of Chetan Bhagat’s novel of the same name. After this came Shashank Khaitan’s Humpty Sharma Ki Dulhania (2014) starring Varun Dhawan and Alia Bhatt. After these three romantic comedies came Rensil D'Silva's black comedy Ungli (2014).

In July 2015, Dharma distributed the Hindi-dubbed version of S. S. Rajamouli's epic film Baahubali: The Beginning (2015), which was originally filmed in Telugu and Tamil. Upon its release, the film became a major critical and commercial success and currently ranks as one of the highest-grossing Indian films of all-time. In August 2015, the company released Karan Malhotra's sports drama Brothers, an adaptation of the 2011 American film Warrior, starring Akshay Kumar and Sidharth Malhotra in the lead roles with Jacqueline Fernandez and Jackie Shroff playing supporting roles. Dharma also collaborated with Phantom Films to co-produce Vikas Bahl's romantic comedy Shaandaar starring Shahid Kapoor and Alia Bhatt, which was released one month later.

March 2016 saw the release of Shakun Batra's family comedy-drama Kapoor & Sons starring Rishi Kapoor, Ratna Pathak Shah, Rajat Kapoor, Fawad Khan, Sidharth Malhotra, and Alia Bhatt. This was followed in September 2016 by Nitya Mehra's time-travel romance Baar Baar Dekho, a co-production with Excel Entertainment starring Katrina Kaif and Sidharth Malhotra. In October 2016, Karan Johar's musical romantic drama Ae Dil Hai Mushkil, featuring Anushka Sharma, Ranbir Kapoor, Aishwarya Rai Bachchan and Fawad Khan in lead roles, was released. This was followed in November 2016 by Gauri Shinde's coming-of-age drama Dear Zindagi, which Dharma co-produced with Red Chillies Entertainment and Hope Productions. Starring Alia Bhatt and Shah Rukh Khan, the film addresses themes of mental health and wellness.

In January 2017, Dharma released Shaad Ali's romantic comedy OK Jaanu starring Aditya Roy Kapur and Shraddha Kapoor, a Hindi-language remake of Mani Ratnam's Tamil film O Kadhal Kanmani (2015). This was followed by Shashank Khaitan's romantic comedy Badrinath Ki Dulhania (2017) starring Varun Dhawan and Alia Bhatt. The film was a follow-up to 2014's Humpty Sharma Ki Dulhania. In April 2017, the company distributed the Hindi version of Baahubali 2: The Conclusion. It became the highest-grossing film in India. The next was Abhay Chopra's mystery thriller Ittefaq, an adaptation of Yash Chopra's 1969 film of the same name. Co-produced with Red Chillies Entertainment and BR Films, the film starred Akshaye Khanna, Sidharth Malhotra and Sonakshi Sinha in lead roles.

Dharma's first release of 2018 was Meghna Gulzar's spy thriller Raazi starring Alia Bhatt and Vicky Kaushal, based on Harinder Sikka's novel Calling Sehmat. The film was a critical and commercial success. Later that year came Shashank Khaitan's romance Dhadak (2018), which launched the careers of lead actors Ishaan Khatter and Janhvi Kapoor. This was an adaptation of the Marathi film Sairat (2016). In November 2018, a new sector of the company was introduced called Dharmatic, focusing on producing digital content for online distribution.

In 2019, Anurag Singh's Kesari, a period drama based on the Battle of Saragarhi, starring Akshay Kumar and Parineeti Chopra in lead roles. The film earned Rs. 200 crores worldwide in the box office and is currently Kumar's highest grossing film. This was followed by Abhishek Varman's period romantic drama Kalank featuring Madhuri Dixit, Sonakshi Sinha, Alia Bhatt, Varun Dhawan, Aditya Roy Kapur, and Sanjay Dutt. Then came the social comedy-drama Good Newwz starring Akshay Kumar, Kareena Kapoor Khan, Diljit Dosanjh and Kiara Advani directed by debutant Raj Mehta which released on 27 December 2019.

On August 12, 2020, Dharma released the biopic Gunjan Saxena: The Kargil Girl starring Jahnvi Kapoor in the lead. Following this, it released the biopic Shershaah starring Sidharth Malhotra and Kiara Advani, based on the life of Capt. Vikram Batra, on August 12, 2021.

Filmography

Dharmatic Entertainment
In November 2018, Dharma Productions launched a new subsidiary called Dharmatic Entertainment. Johar revealed the focus of the division would be on developing and producing digital content for online distribution platforms. He furthermore announced that he and Apoorva Mehta, who also serves as the chief executive officer of Dharma Productions, would be jointly heading the unit, with Somen Mishra (head of creative development at the parent company) and former journalist Aneesha Baig, heading and overseeing fiction and non-fiction content.

In September 2019, Dharmatic Entertainment signed a multi-year exclusive content deal with Netflix India under which the studio would develop and produce a range of fictional and non-fictional series and films for the streaming platform, which would be released as originals.

Film

Television

References

Footnotes

External links
 Official website

Film production companies of India
Hindi cinema
Film production companies based in Mumbai
Entertainment companies established in 1976
Mass media companies established in 1976